Annibale Maggi was a Venetian architect of the Renaissance period. He designed and help build the loggia del Consiglio in Padua in 1493, and was the architect of the house of San Giovanni degli Specchi. Also known as Annibale Bassano or da Bassano.

References

Architects from Padua
15th-century Italian architects
Italian Renaissance architects